Chatra is a part of both Serampore and Baidyabati in the Indian state of West Bengal.

References 

Neighbourhoods in West Bengal
Serampore